The China Finance 40 Forum or CF40 is a Chinese think tank created in 2008 which specializes on issues of economic and financial policy. In January 2021, the University of Pennsylvania's Think Tanks and Civil Societies Program ranked CF40 as #8 top think tank in China, and #31 among think tanks in China, India, Japan
and the Republic of Korea.

History and development

CF40 was created on 12 April 2008 as a club of 40 finance experts under 40 years of age, thus its name. It was founded and developed by Wang Haiming, previously a journalist and chief editor at 21st Century Business Herald. Chen Yuan is its founding chairman. 

Based in Beijing, CF40 has also created the Shanghai Finance Institute (SFI) in Shanghai and the Northern Finance Institute (NFI) in Tianjin, in 2011 and 2016 respectively. Wang Haiming is Executive President of both institutes. Both are located in buildings with connections to China's financial history: SFI in the former Shanghai branch of Yien Yieh Commercial Bank, and NFI in the former Tianjin branch of the Franco-Chinese Bank. 

CF40 organizes events and conferences, alone or in partnership with other think tanks that have included Bruegel the Euro 50 Group, and the Peterson Institute for International Economics.

One of CF40's flagship events is the yearly "Bund Summit" in Shanghai, a series that started in 2019. The 2020 Bund Summit was the venue for Jack Ma's speech on financial regulation in China which has been widely associated with the suspension of Ant Group's initial public offering.

CF40 publishes studies and a periodical journal, China Finance Review. Its yearly "Jingshan Report" is a reference publication on China's financial system.

CF40-affiliated experts

As of early 2021, CF40 advisers include Chen Yulu, Hu Huaibang, Hu Xiaolian, Huang Qifan, Jiang Chaoliang, Jiang Jianqing, Lin Yifu (Justin Lin), Qin Xiao, Wu Jinglian, Yi Gang, Yu Yongding, and Zhu Min.

CF40's resident Senior Fellows include Guan Tao, and its nonresident Senior Fellows include Xiao Gang, Zhang Bin, and Zhang Xiaohui.

See also
 Center for China and Globalization
 China Center for International Economic Exchanges
 Chinese Academy of Social Sciences
 Unirule Institute of Economics

Notes

Think tanks established in 2008
Political and economic think tanks based in China
Research institutes in China
Global economic research
Organizations based in Beijing